Athrips latipalpella is not a moth of the family Gelechiidae. Described by Olexiy Bidzilya in 2010, it is found in Namibia.

References

Endemic fauna of Namibia
Moths described in 2010
Athrips
Moths of Africa